Jamey is a given name. Notable people with the name include:

Jamey Aebersold (born 1939), American jazz saxophonist and music educator
Jamey Bowen (born 1969), former lacrosse player
Jamey Carroll (born 1974), American professional baseball infielder
Jamey Chadwell (born 1977), the head football coach at Delta State University
Jamey Driscoll (born 1986), professional American Cyclocross and road racing cyclist
Jamey Grosser, former professional Supercross racer and current serial entrepreneur originally from Minnesota
Jamey Haddad (born 1952), American percussionist in jazz and world music, specializing in hand drums
Jamey Heath, political activist in Ontario, Canada
Jamey Jasta (born 1977), American musician and vocalist from New Haven, Connecticut
Jamey Jewells (born 1989), Team Canada athlete, women's wheelchair basketball
Jamey Johnson (born 1975), American Grammy Award nominated country music artist
Jamey Mosley (born 1995), American football player
Jamey Richard (born 1984), American football center
Jamey Rootes, American sports executive
Jamey Scott, musical composer for film, television, and video games
Jamey Sheridan (born 1951), American actor
Jamey Wright (born 1974), American professional baseball pitcher

See also
Suicide of Jamey Rodemeyer (1997–2011), openly bisexual teenager
Jaimie (disambiguation)
Jaymay
James (disambiguation)
Jamie
Jim (disambiguation)
Jimbo (disambiguation)
Jimmy (disambiguation)